Holzhauser Straße is a Berlin U-Bahn station located on the  line.
The station was built on an embankment by Grimmek in 1958.

References

U6 (Berlin U-Bahn) stations
Buildings and structures in Reinickendorf
Railway stations in Germany opened in 1958